United Wireless is a cellular telecommunications company in the United States, based in Dodge City, Kansas. 
In December 2014, EpicTouch of Elkhart announced that it would sell its Kansas cellular operations to United Wireless. A franchise agreement between United Wireless and the city of Liberal, Kansas has been proposed. It is a sponsor of the 2015 Pancake Day Talent Show in Liberal, Kansas.

The United Wireless Arena in Dodge City, Kansas is named after the company.

Add 1900MHZ band class 25 to United Wireless LTE network

Unrelated British company
An unrelated company with the same name in the United Kingdom was purchased in 2014 by Stadium Group, Hartlepool, United Kingdom.

References

External links

Mobile phone companies of the United States
Companies based in Kansas